Gilfach Goch railway station served the village of Gilfach Goch, in the historical county of Glamorgan, Wales, from 1881 to 1930 on the Ely Valley Railway.

History 
The station was opened on 9 May 1881 by the Great Western Railway. It closed on 5 March 1928 but reopened three weeks later on 26 March 1928, only to close on 22 September 1930, although it was used for work trains to the Tremains factory from 6 October 1941 as well as unadvertised services. Coal traffic from collieries continued until 1960. The workmens' trains ended in 1947. Any passenger trains after that date were excursions. The line was taken out of use in February 1962 and lifted by May 1964.

References 

Disused railway stations in Rhondda Cynon Taf
Railway stations in Great Britain opened in 1881
Railway stations in Great Britain closed in 1928
Railway stations in Great Britain opened in 1928
Railway stations in Great Britain closed in 1930
1881 establishments in Wales
1930 disestablishments in Wales